Vitina Marcus (born March 1, 1937) is a retired American actress of Sicilian and Hungarian descent. Her parents were Rose and Frank Marcus, and her Sicilian grandmother was named Vitina. She now works in real estate.

Career

Born in New York City, Marcus was a student of Lee Strasberg. She appeared in numerous television shows throughout the 1950s and '60s and was sometimes billed as Dolores Vitina, as in the 1958 film Never Love a Stranger, starring John Drew Barrymore and Steve McQueen. She was in Irwin Allen's 1960 production of The Lost World, as well as Taras Bulba (1962) with Tony Curtis and Yul Brynner.

On television, she appeared in Voyage to the Bottom of the Sea, including the first-season episode "Turn Back the Clock" (in which producer Irwin Allen reused some of her footage from The Lost World) and the second-season episode "Return of the Phantom".

She appeared in two episodes of Lost in Space as 'The Green Lady' (aka 'Athena'), an admirer of stowaway Dr. Zachary Smith's, who endangers the Jupiter II; Have Gun – Will Travel as Della White Cloud, an Apache princess; and in episodes 24 and 26 of The Time Tunnel, "Chase through Time" and "Attack of the Barbarians".  Marcus was in an episode of The Man from U.N.C.L.E., "My Friend: The Gorilla Affair", in 1966. She guest-starred in the TV series Gunsmokes episodes "The Squaw" as Natacea (1961) and "Old Comrade" as Missy (1962). In 1962, she portrayed "Wahkshum" in the episode "The Peddler" on CBS' Rawhide.

Personal life
Marcus gave birth to a daughter, Athena, and a son, Giuliano. She left Hollywood in the late 1960s, and has resided in Las Vegas since the mid-1970s, earning her real estate license in 1986. She has been in real estate since then as Vitina Graham'''.

Children
Her daughter with actor Rory Calhoun, Athena "Kiki" Marcus Calhoun, was voted "The World's Most Beautiful Showgirl" in 1987, and received "The Key to the City of Las Vegas". Athena was also the weekly segment talk show host of Solid POI's Las Vegas Then & Now'' on radio station KLAV 1230 AM.

Filmography

Television

References

External links

1937 births
Living people
Actresses from New York City
People from Bensonhurst, Brooklyn
American television actresses
American film actresses
American real estate businesspeople
21st-century American women